William James Blaikley Best (born 7 September 1942) is a former professional footballer who played football for Northampton Town and Southend United as a forward/winger. During his second spell with Northampton, he mainly performed in midfield and finally defence, as a centre back playing alongside the centre-half.

After retiring from football, Best worked as a painter before becoming a salesman. He was inducted into Northampton's hall of fame in 2006.

Honours

Northampton Town

 Player of the Season: 1974-75; 1976-77

References

External links
Southend Database Profile

1942 births
Living people
English Football League players
English footballers
Northampton Town F.C. players
Southend United F.C. players
Pollok F.C. players
Association football forwards